East Nicolaus is a census-designated place (CDP) in Sutter County, California. The 2010 United States census reported East Nicolaus's population was 225. It is home to East Nicolaus High School (ENHS), a public school that serves grades nine through twelve. The ENHS mascot is the Spartan. ENHS also has an active Future Farmers of America (FFA) chapter.

Geography
According to the United States Census Bureau, the CDP covers an area of 4.6 square miles (11.9 km2), all of it land.

Demographics

The 2010 United States Census reported that East Nicolaus had a population of 225. The racial makeup of East Nicolaus was 159 (70.7%) White, 0 (0.0%) African American, 1 (0.4%) Native American, 19 (8.4%) Asian, 0 (0.0%) Pacific Islander, 41 (18.2%) from other races, and 5 (2.2%) from two or more races. Hispanic or Latino of any race were 49 persons (21.8%).

The Census reported that 225 people (100% of the population) lived in households, 0 (0%) lived in non-institutionalized group quarters, and 0 (0%) were institutionalized.

There were 88 households, out of which 18 (20.5%) had children under the age of 18 living in them, 45 (51.1%) were opposite-sex married couples living together, 6 (6.8%) had a female householder with no husband present, 8 (9.1%) had a male householder with no wife present.  There were 4 (4.5%) unmarried opposite-sex partnerships, and 2 (2.3%) same-sex married couples or partnerships. 25 households (28.4%) were made up of individuals, and 12 (13.6%) had someone living alone who was 65 years of age or older. The average household size was 2.56.  There were 59 families (67.0% of all households); the average family size was 3.19.

The population was spread out, with 48 people (21.3%) under the age of 18, 12 people (5.3%) aged 18 to 24, 45 people (20.0%) aged 25 to 44, 71 people (31.6%) aged 45 to 64, and 49 people (21.8%) who were 65 years of age or older.  The median age was 47.4 years. For every 100 females, there were 112.3 males.  For every 100 females age 18 and over, there were 105.8 males.

There were 101 housing units at an average density of 22.0 per square mile (8.5/km2), of which 67 (76.1%) were owner-occupied, and 21 (23.9%) were occupied by renters. The homeowner vacancy rate was 0%; the rental vacancy rate was 22.2%.  167 people (74.2% of the population) lived in owner-occupied housing units and 58 people (25.8%) lived in rental housing units.

References

Census-designated places in Sutter County, California
Census-designated places in California